Best of the Bees is a compilation album by Mansions. The tracks on the album are all from The EP Initiative, a collection of seven EPs released throughout 2008. Christopher Browder of Mansions picked each song to appear on the compilation.

The album is only available digitally.

Track listing
 "OMG" - 3:54
 "I Swear" - 4:01
 "Never Enough" - 3:27
 "Last to Leave" - 3:49
 "LetsBSdTgthr" - 3:35
 "You Got Caught" - 3:49
 "18th B-Day" - 2:21
 "Unwell" - 2:59
 "Tangerine (Alternate Version)" - 4:23
 "All Eyes on You (Remix)" - 3:26

References

2010 compilation albums
Mansions (band) albums